Dorothy Hood (1902–1970) was an American fashion illustrator.

Early life and education
Hood was born in Lancaster County, Pennsylvania. She studied at New York School of Applied Design and Art Students League of New York.

Career

She began working for department stores, including Saks Fifth Avenue, and for art services. Hood designed a logo for Lord & Taylor of the American Beauty rose, to promote "The American Look", a marketing strategy developed by Dorothy Shaver who was the company's first vice president and became president in 1945. Hood and other illustrators—like Jean Karnoff, Helen Hall, and Carl Wilson—incorporated the logo in advertisements for the store. Paul Shaw from Bloomberg Business states that she was the first to incorporate the logo in ads and "As early as 1947, her logos—distinctive in their thin, scratchy line—emerge from swirling pen strokes unifying the various illustrations in an advertisement." Hood was the best known American fashion illustrator at that time and was Lord & Taylor's top illustrator.

Hood was inducted into the Society of Illustrators's Hall of Fame in 1992. Known for her ability to create a "powerful visual identity" for Lord & Taylor, her illustrations are among the 20th-century fashion illustrations in the Frances Neady collection at the Fashion Institute of Technology.

References

1902 births
1970 deaths
American women illustrators
American illustrators
Art Students League of New York alumni
Fashion illustrators
20th-century American women artists